Agencourt is a commune in the Côte-d'Or department in the Bourgogne-Franche-Comté region of eastern France.

The inhabitants of the commune are known as Agencourtois or Agencourtoises.

Geography
Agencourt is located some 20 km south of Dijon on the A31 autoroute (E17) with Exit 1 in the commune.  The motorway forms the western border of the commune with Nuits-Saint-Georges on the opposite side of the motorway.  Access to the commune is on the D8 road (Rue du Village) from west to east from Nuits-Saint-Georges which continues east to Saint-Nicolas-les-Citeaux. Agencourt town is spread along the Highway D8 and is the only built-up area in the commune which consists entirely of farmland except for the Bois de Charbonniere on the eastern side of the commune.

Neighbouring communes and villages

Heraldry

Administration

List of Successive Mayors of Agencourt

Population

Culture and heritage

Civil heritage
The commune has one building that is registered as an historical monument:
Agencourt Fortified House (1643) with the remains of a moat: the main building from the 17th century, stables from 1643.

Religious heritage
The commune has one religious building that is registered as an historical monument:
The Parish Church of Notre-Dame (12th century). The Church contains many items that are registered as historical objects:
A Monumental Painting: Cherubs (17th century)
A Monumental Painting: Centaur (16th century)
A Consecrational Cross (14th century)
A Monumental Painting: Education of the Virgin and St. Margaret (15th century)
A Monumental Painting: Saint Georges (16th century)
A Monumental Painting: Saint Michel and Saint Blaise (15th century)
The Parish Church of the Assumption contains one item that is registered as an historical object:
A Heraldic Stained glass window for the Vichy family (1500)

See also
 Communes of the Côte-d'Or department

References

External links
Agencourt on Géoportail, National Geographic Institute (IGN) website 
Agencour on the 1750 Cassini Map

Communes of Côte-d'Or